Nassor Saadun Hamoud (born 23 March 2001), commonly known as Nassor Hamoud, is a Tanzanian footballer who plays for Šumadija Aranđelovac of the Serbian League West.

Club career
In his native Tanzania Hamoud played for Kagera Sugar of the Tanzanian Premier League. From 2018 to 2020 he played for Tersana SC of the Egyptian Second Division. In February 2020 he made the jump to Europe and signed for OFK Žarkovo of the Serbian First League for the 2019–20 season on a two-year contract. In total, he made two league appearances for the club with his debut coming on 30 May 2020 against FK Zlatibor Čajetina. He then switched to FK Šumadija Aranđelovac before being loaned out to MFK Vyškov in 2021.

International career
Hamoud was named to Tanzania's squad for the 2021 Africa U-20 Cup of Nations and appeared in all three of the team's matches.

In March 2021 Hamoud was named as one of the few foreign-based players on Kim Poulsen's provisional roster for two senior friendlies against Kenya. In May the same year, he was again added to the provisional squad for a friendly against Malawi but he did not make the final roster.

References

External links
 
 
 Monde Football profile

2001 births
Living people
Tanzanian footballers
Tanzania international footballers
Tanzania under-20 international footballers
Association football midfielders
Tanzanian expatriate footballers
Expatriate footballers in Serbia